Tawa AFC is an association football club in Tawa, Wellington, New Zealand. They currently compete in the Capital 1 run by Capital Football.

Tawa highest men's honour is winning the, as then known, Central League in 1994. Since then, their second best finish was in 2009 when they won the Capital Premier League.

The highest honour Tawa has got in the Women's game is winning the Wellington Premier Women's League in 2005.

References

External links
Club Website
UltimateNZSoccer club profile
Capital Football profile

Association football clubs in Wellington
Sport in Wellington City
Association football clubs established in 1971
1971 establishments in New Zealand